Tonnicinctus is an extinct species of pampatheriid that lived in Argentina during the Pleistocene and Holocene.

Description
Tonnicinctus inhabited cool grassland regions. It was a medium-sized pampatheriid, smaller than its better-known relatives like Pampatherium and Holmesina. It is distinguishes from other Pampathreres by: osteoderms which are intermediate in thickness between Pampatherium and Holmesina; very wide anterior and lateral margins with several large and deep foramina; wide and uniform marginal elevation in the fixed osteoderms and very narrow marginal elevation in movable and semi-movable osteoderms of the scapular and pelvic buckler.

References

Prehistoric cingulates
Pleistocene xenarthrans
Pleistocene mammals of South America

Prehistoric placental genera
Pleistocene first appearances
Holocene extinctions

Pleistocene Argentina
Fossils of Argentina